Salarias nigrocinctus, the blackstreaked blenny, is a species of combtooth blenny found in the Pacific ocean, around Tonga.

References

nigrocinctus
Taxa named by Hans Bath
Fish described in 1996